Maha Raja's Boy's High School (M.R.B.H. School), Paralakhemundi was established in the year 1875 by the Hon'ble Maharaja of Paralakhemundi. M.R.B.H. School has a combined strength of about 80 teachers and other staff. It is one of the oldest and best schools of Odisha. This is a high school exclusively for boys.

Campus and facilities 
The campus is spread in an area of about 1.5-2 acres with hundreds of class rooms. The school has its own library, science laboratory, playground. The school also has its own wing of N.A.C., Scout, Navy and Red cross.

Admissions
The external applicants are selected on a merit basis.

Alumni
The school has produced numerous politicians, bureaucrats, engineers, doctors, intellectuals over a period of 150 years.

External links
 Gajapat district's official page

Boys' schools in India
High schools and secondary schools in Odisha
Gajapati district
Educational institutions established in 1875
1875 establishments in India